San Martino is a 16th-century, Roman Catholic church in Burano, an island of the city of Venice, region of the Veneto, Italy. The church was reconsecrated in 1645.

Roman Catholic churches in Venice
16th-century Roman Catholic church buildings in Italy
Roman Catholic churches completed in 1645
Burano